Phaenops drummondi, the flatheaded fir borer, is a species of metallic wood-boring beetle in the family Buprestidae. It is found in North America.

Subspecies
These two subspecies belong to the species Phaenops drummondi:
 Phaenops drummondi drummondi (Kirby, 1837)
 Phaenops drummondi nicolayi (Obenberger, 1944)

References

Further reading

External links

 

Buprestidae
Articles created by Qbugbot
Beetles described in 1837